Skärplinge is a locality situated in Tierp Municipality, Uppsala County, Sweden with 673 inhabitants in 2010.

The main town of Skärplinge contains a school, an ICA, a pizza restaurant and a few shops.

Skärplinge is near the small village of Åkerby.

References 

Populated places in Uppsala County
Populated places in Tierp Municipality